K. Ashok Kumar (b 1953) is an Indian politician and Member of Parliament elected from Tamil Nadu. He is elected to the Lok Sabha from Krishnagiri constituency as an Anna Dravida Munnetra Kazhagam candidate in 2014 election.

He is the chairman of the Krishnagiri District Panchayat.

Electoral performance

References 

All India Anna Dravida Munnetra Kazhagam politicians
Living people
India MPs 2014–2019
Lok Sabha members from Tamil Nadu
1953 births
People from Krishnagiri district
Tamil Nadu MLAs 2021–2026
Tamil Nadu politicians